Sigma Lambda Alpha is a scholastic honor society that recognizes academic achievement among students in the field of landscape architecture.

The society was founded at University of Minnesota on September 24, 1977, admitted to the Association of College Honor Societies in 1983 and achieved full membership in 1986. It operates within the Council of Educators in Landscape Architecture (CELA), a global association of landscape architecture faculty. 

Sigma Lambda Alpha is a registered 501(c)(3) charity. 

Sigma Lambda Alpha honor society has 54 active chapters across the United States and one in Canada. Since 1977 the society has inducted 10,443 members.

See also
 Association of College Honor Societies

References

External links
 ACHS Sigma Lambda Alpha entry

Association of College Honor Societies
Honor societies
Student organizations established in 1977
1977 establishments in Minnesota